Red starfish (or red sea star) is a common name for several starfish and may refer to:

Callopatiria granifera, native to southern African coasts
Echinaster sepositus, native to the Mediterranean and eastern Atlantic
Fromia indica, native to the Indian Ocean and western Pacific and common in the aquarium trade
Fromia milleporella, native to the Indian Ocean and western Pacific and common in the aquarium trade